Leneu is a small uninhabited island in Torba Province of Vanuatu in the Pacific Ocean. Leneu lies close to Sola on Vanua Lava and is a part of Banks Islands archipelago.

Name

References

Islands of Vanuatu
Sanma Province
Uninhabited islands of Vanuatu